Felipe H. López is a Zapotec-language scholar and writer.

Life
López was born in the town of San Lucas Quiaviní, Oaxaca in Mexico. At the age 16, he migrated to Los Angeles, California, speaking no English and little Spanish. Later, he obtained a Ph.D. from the University of California, Los Angeles in Urban planning, and currently he is a faculty member at Seton Hall University.  He has published poetry, academic articles, and Zapotec-language learning materials. In 2021, he had an appearance in Netflix's animated series City of Ghosts, where he represented himself, a Zapotec-language professor.

Works
 Munro, Pamela & Felipe H. Lopez et al. "Di'csyonaary x:tèe'n dìi'zh sah Sann Lu'uc = San Lucas Quiaviní Zapotec dictionary" 	Los Angeles : UCLA Chicano Studies Research Center Publications, 1999.

 Lopez, Felipe H. 2020. "Recovering Knowledge through Forgotten Words." Global SL (blog), Campus Compact, July 17, 2020.

 Lopez, Felipe H., Luis Escala-Rabadan, and Raul Hinojosa. 2001. "Migrant Associations, Remittances, and Regional Development between Los Angeles and Oaxaca, Mexico." UCLA NAID.

 Lopez, Felipe H., and David Runsten. 2004. "Mixtecs and Zapotecs Working in California: Rural and Urban Experiences." In Indigenous Mexican Migrants in the United States, edited by Jonathan Fox and Gaspar Rivera-Salgado, 249-78. San Diego: Center for U.S.-Mexican Studies, UCSD/Center for Comparative Immigration Studies, UCSD.

References

External links
 [video] Presentation of Dizhsa Nabani, web-based documentary film series, with Felipe H. Lopez, Brook Lilehaugen, Eddie Oggborn, Sabea Evans, and Kathryn Goldberg at the University of Pennsylvania, Philadelphia. 
 Poetry on 'Latin American Literature Today 

Zapotec-language writers
Indigenous culture in the United States
Year of birth missing (living people)
Living people